is a JR West Hakubi Line station. It is in Matsuyama, Takahashi, Okayama Prefecture, Japan.

History
1926-06-20: Bitchū-Hirose Station opens at the same time as the Hakubi Minami Line section between Minagi and Kinoyama stations
1987-04-01: Japanese National Railways is privatized, and Bitchū-Hirose Station became a JR West station
2007-07-03: Bitchū-Hirose Station begins using the ICOCA automated ticket system

Station layout
Bitchū-Hirose Station is an unmanned station which has two platforms capable of handling two lines simultaneously. Track 1 is next to the station building. Tracks 2 and 3 on the island platform can be reached through the bridge (see photo at right).

Around the station
Bitchū-Hirose Station is located within a bend in the Takahashi River, which is across Japan National Route 180, about 50m south of the station. The Takahashi-Tamagawa Post Office is located nearby, as is Takahashi Municipal Tamagawa Elementary School.

Highway access
 Japan National Route 180
 Okayama Prefectural Route 293 (Utodani-Takahashi Route)

Connecting lines
JR West Hakubi Line
Minagi Station — Bitchū-Hirose Station — Bitchū-Takahashi Station

See also
List of railway stations in Japan

External links

 JR West

Hakubi Line
Railway stations in Okayama Prefecture
Railway stations in Japan opened in 1926